Antonio Grillo (born 8 December 1991) is an Italian football player.

Career

On 29 July 2015, Salernitana signed Grillo from Parma after he had already been loaned to the club. On 31 August 2015, he was loaned to Paganese.

References

External links
 
 Antonio Grillo profile at football.it

1991 births
Living people
People from Avellino
Italian footballers
Association football midfielders
Potenza S.C. players
Paganese Calcio 1926 players
S.S. Racing Club Fondi players
Parma Calcio 1913 players
U.S. Salernitana 1919 players
F.C. Pro Vercelli 1892 players
F.C. Rieti players
Serie C players
Serie D players
Footballers from Campania
Sportspeople from the Province of Avellino